Berhane Aregai is an Eritrean former footballer who played as a midfielder for the Eritrea national team. With five goals in 11 matches, Aregai is the country's joint all-time top goalscorer.

Career statistics

International

Scores and results list Eritrea's goal tally first, score column indicates score after each Eritrea goal.

References

External links
 

Year of birth missing (living people)
Living people
Eritrean footballers
Association football midfielders
APR F.C. players
Rwanda National Football League players
Eritrean expatriate footballers
Eritrean expatriate sportspeople in Rwanda
Expatriate footballers in Rwanda
Eritrea international footballers